Diquafosol (tradename Diquas) is a pharmaceutical drug for the treatment of dry eye disease. It was approved for use in Japan in 2010. It is formulated as a 3% ophthalmic solution of the tetrasodium salt.

Its mechanism of action involves agonism of the P2Y2 purinogenic receptor.

References

Ophthalmology drugs
Nucleotides